The Bountiful Historic District in Bountiful, Utah has significance dating to 1850.  It is a  historic district that was listed on the National Register of Historic Places in 2005.  It includes Mid 19th Century Revival, Late Victorian, and other architecture, among its 522 contributing buildings and one contributing site.

See also
West Bountiful Historic District, also NRHP-listed and in the neighboring city of West Bountiful, Utah

References

Georgian architecture in Utah
Victorian architecture in Utah
Buildings and structures in Bountiful, Utah
Historic districts on the National Register of Historic Places in Utah
National Register of Historic Places in Davis County, Utah